Ahmed Awad Ahmed Abu Al-Khair (born 1 January 1987), known as Ahmed Awad, is an Egyptian judoka. He was born in Sharkia, Egypt. Awad competed in the men's 66 kg judo at the 2012 Summer Olympics in London. He lost in the round of 16 to Tarlan Karimov from Azerbaijan.

References

External links
 
 
 
 

1987 births
Living people
Egyptian male judoka
Olympic judoka of Egypt
Judoka at the 2012 Summer Olympics
Mediterranean Games silver medalists for Egypt
Mediterranean Games medalists in judo
Competitors at the 2009 Mediterranean Games
African Games gold medalists for Egypt
African Games medalists in judo
Competitors at the 2011 All-Africa Games
People from Sharqia Governorate
21st-century Egyptian people